Romano cheese is a term used in the United States and Canada for a class of hard, salty cheese suitable primarily for grating similar to Pecorino Romano, from which the name is derived. In spite of the name, it should not be confused with genuine Pecorino Romano which is an Italian product recognized and protected by the laws of the European Union, though United States law allows Romano produced entirely from sheep's milk to be called "Pecorino Romano".  

Per U.S. Food and Drug Administration regulations, Romano cheese can be made from cow, goat, and/or sheep's milk. It must contain less than 34% water and at least 38% milkfat. Cream, skim milk and/or dry milk and water can be added or removed to create the correct level of milkfat. Milk can be bleached with benzoyl peroxide or a mixture of benzoyl peroxide with potassium alum, calcium sulfate, and magnesium carbonate but, in that case, vitamin A must be added after treatment. Safe artificial blue or green coloring may be added only to counter any yellow coloring of the milk. Rennet does not need to be used and any "suitable milk-clotting enzyme that produces equivalent curd formation" may be used. The curd is drained, pressed into forms and the cheese is then soaked in brine for 24 hours. After brining, it is rubbed with salt and washed several times. Next it is dry-cured. It is occasionally turned and scraped, and may be coated with vegetable oil. Romano must be aged at least five months.

Romano cheeses are often grated over pasta, often in combination with Parmesan.

See also 
 Pecorino Romano, Italian cheese from which Romano took its name

References 

American cheeses